Beggen is a quarter in northern Luxembourg City, in southern Luxembourg. , the quarter has a population of 3,746 inhabitants. 

The quarter is the location of the 19th century Château de Beggen, built on the ruins of a former 18th century paper mill. In the 20th century, the château has served, successively, as the home of the director general of Luxembourg's notable steel company, ARBED, a base for both occupying Wehrmacht forces and, later, the liberating US troops during the Second World War, a hotel, an embassy of the Soviet Union, and currently, the embassy of the Russian Federation in Luxembourg. 

Beggen is home to FC Avenir Beggen, a historically successful football club that has struggled in the last years and now plays at level 4 in the Luxembourg football league.

References

External links

Quarters of Luxembourg City